Olmito is a census-designated place (CDP) in Cameron County, Texas, United States. Olmito is Spanish for "little elm". The population was 1,210 at the 2010 census. It is part of the Brownsville–Harlingen Metropolitan Statistical Area. Olmito is the self-described "mesquite capital of the world."

Geography
Olmito is located in south-central Cameron County at  (26.019655, -97.534690). Interstate 69E/U.S. Route 77/U.S. Route 83 runs along the eastern side of the community, leading northwest  to San Benito and south  to Brownsville.

Olmito Lake is in the northern part of the town, and the Resaca del Rancho Viejo, an ancient channel of the Rio Grande, forms the western edge of the community.

Demographics
As of the census of 2000, there were 1,198 people, 303 households, and 270 families residing in the CDP. The population density was 1,787.9 people per square mile (690.4/km2). There were 322 housing units at an average density of 480.6/sq mi (185.6/km2). The racial makeup of the CDP was 98.25% White, 1.34% from other races, and 0.42% from two or more races. Hispanic or Latino of any race were 96.49% of the population.

There were 303 households, out of which 56.8% had children under the age of 18 living with them, 68.3% were married couples living together, 18.2% had a female householder with no husband present, and 10.6% were non-families. 9.9% of all households were made up of individuals, and 5.3% had someone living alone who was 65 years of age or older. The average household size was 3.95 and the average family size was 4.22.

In the CDP, the population was spread out, with 38.1% under the age of 18, 12.9% from 18 to 24, 23.5% from 25 to 44, 17.7% from 45 to 64, and 7.8% who were 65 years of age or older. The median age was 24 years. For every 100 females, there were 96.1 males. For every 100 females age 18 and over, there were 85.7 males.

The median income for a household in the CDP was $13,333, and the median income for a family was $15,000. Males had a median income of $13,125 versus $12,279 for females. The per capita income for the CDP was $5,170. About 47.6% of families and 55.9% of the population were below the poverty line, including 73.4% of those under age 18 and 20.3% of those age 65 or over.

Education
Olmito is served by the Los Fresnos Consolidated Independent School District.

In addition, South Texas Independent School District operates magnet schools that serve the community.

Government and infrastructure
The United States Postal Service operates the Olmito Post Office.

Climate
The climate in this area is characterized by hot, humid summers and generally mild to cool winters.  According to the Köppen Climate Classification system, Olmito has a humid subtropical climate, abbreviated "Cfa" on climate maps.

References

Census-designated places in Cameron County, Texas
Census-designated places in Texas